Deportation Blues is the fourth studio album by American singer-songwriter B.C. Camplight. It was released on August 24, 2018 through Bella Union.

Track listing

References

2018 albums
Bella Union albums